The whitetip weasel shark (Paragaleus leucolomatus) is a weasel shark of the family Hemigaleidae. Only one specimen, caught off Kosi Bay, South Africa, has been caught. That specimen was 96 cm long. In 2020, a fuzzy image believed to be this shark was obtained on the show Extinct or Alive.

The reproduction of this shark is viviparous.

References

 

Paragaleus
Fish described in 1985